The Other Side is the second studio album by the Australian pop rock band 1927, which was released in July 1990. It peaked at number three on the ARIA Albums chart and reached No. 50 on its Australian Year End Albums Chart for 1990.

Background 

The Other Side is the second studio album by Australian pop rock group, 1927. Founder Garry Frost had left early in 1990. The band recorded the album with Eric Weideman (lead vocals and guitar) as principal songwriter, and Charles Fisher producing and Frost co-producing. The line-up was Weidman joined by James Barton on drums and backing vocals, Charlie Cole on keyboards and backing vocals, and Garry's brother Bill Frost on bass guitar and backing vocals.

The Other Side peaked at No. 3 in July 1990 on the ARIA Albums chart and was preceded by their Top 20 hit single, "Tell Me a Story" (May). Australian musicologist, Ian McFarlane described the album as "full of lush, ambitious arrangements and well-crafted pop, but it lacked the charm and rousing choruses" of their debut album, ...Ish (1989). According to The Canberra Times Cherie Marriott, "it comprises a strong selection of rock tracks and ballads whose subject matter range from love and friendship to thought provoking global issues."

Track listing

Personnel 

1927

 James Barton – drums, backing vocals
 Charlie Cole – keyboards, backing vocals
 Bill Frost – bass guitar, backing vocals
 Eric Weideman – lead vocals, guitar

Additional musicians
 Dave Faulkner
 Erana Clark
 Garry Frost
 Gyan
 Maggie McKinney
 Rick Chadwick
 Rick Price,
 Shauna Jenson
 Sunil De Silva
 Graham Jessie – saxophone (track 5)

Artisans

 Don Bartley – mastering
 Jim Bonnefond – engineer, remixer (tracks 1–5, 7)
 Oki Doke – photography
 Charles Fisher – producer, remixer (tracks 1–5, 7)
 Trudi Fletcher – art direction
 Garry Frost – co-producer (tracks 1, 6, 9, 10)
 David Mackie – assistant engineer
 Philip Mortlock – cover concept

Charts

Weekly charts

Year-end charts

Certifications

References

1990 albums
1927 (band) albums
Albums produced by Charles Fisher (producer)
Warner Music Group albums